Events in the year 2000 in Burkina Faso.

Incumbents 

 President: Blaise Compaoré
 Prime Minister: Kadré Désiré Ouédraogo (until 29 December), Paramanga Ernest Yonli (from 29 December)

Events 

 December – The government agrees to the formation of a U.N. body to oversee weapons imports to the country following claims that it had aided in arms smuggling to rebels in Sierra Leone and Angola.

Deaths

References 

 
2000s in Burkina Faso
Years of the 21st century in Burkina Faso
Burkina Faso
Burkina Faso